Bura may refer to:

Places
 Bura (Achaea), a city in Greece
 Boura, Burkina Faso (disambiguation), also spelled Bura
 Bura, Iran (disambiguation)
 Bura, Taita-Taveta District, Kenya
 Bura, Tana River District, Kenya

People and civilizations
 Bura people or Kilba, an ethnic group in Nigeria
 Bura language (also Bura-Pabir), a Chadic language spoken in Nigeria
 Bura archaeological site, an ancient and medieval civilization in southwest Niger
 Bura culture, known for ceramics and metallurgy
 John Bura (1944–2023), Ukrainian Greek Catholic prelate in the United States
 Olha Bura (1986–2014), Ukrainian activist

Sport and games 
 Bura (footballer) (born 1988), Portuguese footballer
 Bura (water polo club), Croatian water polo club
 Bura (card game), a Russian prisoners' card game

Other
 Bura (beetle), a genus of beetles
 Bura (mythology), a figure in Greek mythology
 Bura (wind), the Serbo-Croatian name for the bora wind in the northern Mediterranean
 Bura Irrigation and Settlement Project (Kenya), a large irrigation project
 BURA (information technology), Backup, Recovery and Archiving
 BURA (Brunel University Research Archives) at Brunel University London

Language and nationality disambiguation pages